The BBC World Service is an international broadcaster owned and operated by the BBC. It is the world's largest external broadcaster in terms of reception area, language selection and audience reach. It broadcasts radio news, speech and discussions in more than 40 languages to many parts of the world on analogue and digital shortwave platforms, internet streaming, podcasting, satellite, DAB, FM and MW relays. In 2015, the World Service reached an average of 210 million people a week (via TV, radio and online). In November 2016, the BBC announced that it would start broadcasting in additional languages including Amharic and Igbo, in its biggest expansion since the 1940s.

BBC World Service English maintains eight regional feeds with several programme variations, covering, respectively, East and South Africa; West and Central Africa; Europe and Middle East; the Americas and Caribbean; East Asia; South Asia; Australasia; and the United Kingdom. There are also two separate online-only streams with one being more news-oriented, known as News Internet. The service broadcasts 24 hours a day.

The World Service claims that its aim is to be "the world's best-known and most-respected voice in international broadcasting", while retaining a "balanced British view" of international developments. Former director Peter Horrocks visualised the organisation as fighting an "information war" of soft power against Russian and Chinese international state media, including RT. As such, the BBC has been banned in both Russia and China, the former following its 2022 invasion of Ukraine and the latter for having "violated regulations that news bulletins should be 'truthful and fair".

The director of the BBC World Service is Liliane Landor; the controller of the BBC World Service in English is Jon Zilkha.

History

Early years
The BBC World Service began on 19 December 1932 as the BBC Empire Service, broadcasting on shortwave and aimed principally at English speakers across the British Empire. In his first Christmas Message (1932), King George V characterised the service as intended for "men and women, so cut off by the snow, the desert, or the sea, that only voices out of the air can reach them". First hopes for the Empire Service were low. The Director General, Sir John Reith, said in the opening programme:

Don't expect too much in the early days; for some time we shall transmit comparatively simple programmes, to give the best chance of intelligible reception and provide evidence as to the type of material most suitable for the service in each zone. The programmes will neither be very interesting nor very good.Transcribed from recording on World Service 75th Anniversary DVD; full extract transmitted as part of opening program – the Reith Global Debate – of the 'Free to Speak' 75th anniversary season

This address was read out five times as the BBC broadcast it live to different parts of the world.

On 3 January 1938 the first foreign-language service was launched—in Arabic. Programmes in German, Italian and French started on 27 September 1938, and by the end of 1942, the BBC had started broadcasts in all major European languages. As a result, the Empire Service was renamed the BBC Overseas Service in November 1939, supplemented by the addition of a dedicated BBC European Service from 1941. Funding for these services—known administratively as the External Services of the BBC—came not from the domestic licence fee but from government grant-in-aid (from the Foreign Office budget).

The External Services broadcast propaganda during the Second World War of 1939–1945. Its French service  also sent coded messages to the French Resistance. George Orwell broadcast many news bulletins on the Eastern Service during the Second World War.

By the end of the 1940s the number of broadcast languages had expanded and reception had improved, following the opening of a relay in Malaya and of the Limassol relay in Cyprus in 1957. On 1 May 1965 the service took its current name of BBC World Service. It expanded its reach with the opening of the Ascension Island relay in 1966, serving African audiences with a stronger signal and better reception, and with the later relay on the Island of Masirah in Oman.

In August 1985 the service went off-air for the first time when workers went on strike in protest at the British government's decision to ban a documentary featuring an interview with Martin McGuinness of Sinn Féin.

Subsequently, financial pressures decreased the number and the types of services offered by the BBC. Audiences in countries with wide access to Internet services have less need for terrestrial radio. Broadcasts in German ended in March 1999, after research showed that the majority of German listeners tuned into the English-language service. Broadcasts in Dutch, Finnish, French, Hebrew, Italian, Japanese and Malay stopped for similar reasons.

Twenty-first century

On 25 October 2005, the BBC announced that broadcasts in Bulgarian, Croatian, Czech, Greek, Hungarian, Kazakh, Polish, Slovak, Slovene and Thai would end by March 2006, to finance the launch in 2007 of television news services in Arabic and Persian. Additionally, Romanian broadcasts ceased on 1 August 2008.

In 2011, BBC Kyrgyz service newsreader and producer Arslan Koichiev resigned from his BBC post after revelations and claims of involvement in the Kyrgyzstan revolution of April 2010.  He had been based in London, but often travelled to Kyrgyzstan and used BBC resources to agitate against President Kurmanbek Bakiyev, appearing on a Kyrgyz radio station under a pseudonym with a disguised voice.  One of the leaders of the revolution, Aliyasbek Alymkulov, named the producer as his mentor and claimed that they had discussed preparations for the revolution.
According to London newspaper the Evening Standard, "Mr Alymkulov claimed that Koichiev arranged secret meetings "through the BBC" and organised the march at the presidential palace on 7 April 2010"

In January 2011, the closure of the Albanian, Macedonian and Serbian, as well English for the Caribbean and Portuguese for Africa, services was announced. The British government announced that the three Balkan countries had wide access to international information, and so broadcasts in the local languages had become unnecessary. This decision reflected the financial situation the Corporation faced following transfer of responsibility for the Service from the Foreign Office, so that it would in future have been funded from within licence-fee income. The Russian, Ukrainian, Mandarin Chinese, Turkish, Vietnamese and Spanish for Cuba services ceased radio broadcasting, and the Hindi, Indonesian, Kyrgyz, Nepali, Swahili, Kinyarwanda and Kirundi services ceased shortwave transmissions. As part of the 16% budget cut, 650 jobs were eliminated.

In October 2010, the UK government announced that it was reducing the service’s revenue funding by 16% and its capital funding by 52% by 2016-17. This necessitated over 650 staff leaving. Funding from the Foreign & Commonwealth Office would end in April 2014, when funding would mainly be from the television licence fee.

From 2010, the service started transforming from a mainly radio-based operation to multi-media. This was in response to changes in technology and consumer behaviour causing a decline in demand for short-wave radio as audiences moved to online, FM radio and television news, and increased international competition.

In 2012 London staff moved from Bush House to Broadcasting House, so co-located with other BBC News departments. About 35% of its 1,518 full-time equivalent staff in 2014 were based overseas at 115 locations. From 2014 the service became part of World Service Group under the Director of BBC News and Current Affairs.

From 2016, 1,100 additional staff were recruited as part of an expansion of the World Service, about a 70% increase, funded by the Foreign, Commonwealth & Development Office providing £254 million/year for five years, partly a reversal of the government decision that the television licence fee would fund the service from 2014. This was the biggest service expansion since World War II.

In 2022, a new London-based China unit was in development, described by the government as "focused on exposing the challenges and realities currently facing China and its fight for global influence".

Operation

The Service broadcasts from Broadcasting House in London, which is also headquarters of the corporation. It is located in the newer parts of the building, which contains radio and television studios for use by the overseas language services. The building also contains an integrated newsroom used by the international World Service, the international television channel BBC World News, the domestic television and radio BBC News bulletins, the BBC News Channel and BBC Online.

At its launch, the Service was located along with most radio output in Broadcasting House. However, following the explosion of a parachute mine nearby on 8 December 1940, it relocated to premises away from the likely target of Broadcasting House. The Overseas service relocated to Oxford Street while the European service moved temporarily to the emergency broadcasting facilities at Maida Vale Studios. The European services moved permanently into Bush House towards the end of 1940, completing the move in 1941, with the Overseas services joining them in 1958. Bush House subsequently became the home of the BBC World Service and the building itself has gained a global reputation with the audience of the service. However, the building was vacated in 2012 as a result of the Broadcasting House redevelopment and the end of the building's lease that year; the first service to move was the Burmese Service on 11 March 2012 and the final broadcast from Bush House was a news bulletin broadcast at 11.00GMT on 12 July 2012.

The BBC World Service encompasses an English 24-hour global radio network and separate services in 27 other languages. News and information is available in these languages on the BBC website, with many having RSS feeds and specific versions for use on mobile devices, and some also offer email notification of stories. In addition to the English service, 18 of the language services broadcast a radio service using the short wave, AM or FM bands. These are also available to listen live or can be listened to later (usually for seven days) over the Internet and, in the case of seven language services, can be downloaded as podcasts. News is also available from the BBC News 'app', which is available from both iTunes and the Google Play Store. In recent years, video content has also been used by the World Service: 16 language services show video reports on the website, and the Arabic and Persian services have their own television channels. TV is also used to broadcast the radio service, with local cable and satellite operators providing the English network (and occasionally some local language services) free to air. The English service is also available on digital radio in the UK and Europe.

Traditionally, the Service relied on shortwave broadcasts, because of their ability to overcome barriers of censorship, distance, and spectrum scarcity. The BBC has maintained a worldwide network of shortwave relay stations since the 1940s, mainly in former British colonies. These cross-border broadcasts have also been used in special circumstances for emergency messages to British subjects abroad, such as the advice to evacuate Jordan during the Black September incidents of September 1970. These facilities were privatised in 1997 as Merlin Communications, and later acquired and operated as part of a wider network for multiple broadcasters by VT Communications (now part of Babcock International Group). It is also common for BBC programmes to air on Voice of America or ORF transmitters, while their programming is relayed by a station located inside the UK. However, since the 1980s, satellite distribution has made it possible for local stations to relay BBC programmes.

BBC World Service is not regulated by Ofcom. as the BBC generally is. Instead the BBC is responsible for editorial independence and setting strategic direction. It defines the remit, scope, annual budget and main commitments of the World Service, and agrees "objectives, targets and priorities" with the British Foreign Secretary in a document named the BBC World Service Licence. The Chair of the BBC Board and the Foreign Secretary (or representatives) meet at least annually to review performance against these objectives, priorities and targets.

Funding
The World Service was funded for decades by grant-in-aid through the Foreign and Commonwealth Office until 1 April 2014. Since then it has been funded by a mixture of the United Kingdom's television licence fee, limited advertising profits of BBC Studios, and Foreign, Commonwealth and Development Office funding.

From 2014 the service was guaranteed £289 million (allocated over a five-year period ending in 2020) from the UK government. In 2016, the government announced that the licence fee funding for the World Service would be £254 million/year for the five years from 2017. From 2016 to 2022 the Foreign, Commonwealth and Development Office contributed over £470 million to the World Service via its World 2020 Programme, about 80% of which is categorised as Overseas Development Assistance, amounting to about a quarter of the World Service budget. In November 2022, the government confirmed the continuing involvement of the Foreign, Commonwealth and Development Office in funding the World Service.

Languages

This table lists the various language services operated by the BBC World Service with start and closure dates, where known/applicable.

Current services

Former services

Radio programming in English

The World Service in English mainly broadcasts news and analysis. The mainstays of the current schedule are Newsday, Newshour and The Newsroom. There are daily science programmes: Health Check, the technology programme Digital Planet and Science in Action. At weekends, some of the schedule is taken up by Sportsworld, which often includes live commentary of Premier League football matches. Other weekend sport shows include The Sports Hour and Stumped, a cricket programme co-produced with All India Radio and the Australian Broadcasting Corporation. On Sundays the international, interdisciplinary discussion programme The Forum is broadcast. Outlook is a human interest programme presented by Matthew Bannister and Jo Fidgen, which was first broadcast in July 1966 and presented for more than thirty years by John Tidmarsh. Trending describes itself as "explaining the stories the world is sharing..." Regular music programmes were reintroduced with the autumn schedule in 2015. Many programmes, particularly speech-based ones, are also available as podcasts. Business Daily is a weekday live international business news programme, which broadcasts from 8:32:30am to 8:59:00am UK time from Broadcasting House in London.

Previous radio programming in English

Previous broadcasts included popular music programmes presented by John Peel and classical music programmes presented by Edward Greenfield. There have also been religious programmes, of mostly Anglican celebration and often from the Church of St. Martin in the Fields, weekly drama, English-language lessons, and comedy including Just A Minute. Other notable previous programmes include Letter from America by Alistair Cooke, which was broadcast for over fifty years; Off the Shelf with its daily reading from a novel, biography or history book; A Jolly Good Show, a music request programme presented by Dave Lee Travis; Waveguide, a radio reception guide; and The Merchant Navy Programme, a show for seafarers presented by Malcolm Billings; The Morning Show, Good Morning Africa and PM, all presented by Pete Myers in the 1960s and 1970s.

Since the late 1990s, the station has focused more on news, with bulletins added every half-hour following the outbreak of the Iraq War.

News
News is at the core of the scheduling. A five-minute bulletin is generally transmitted at 01 past the hour, with a two-minute summary at 30 past the hour. Sometimes these are separate from other programming, or alternatively made integral to the programme (such as with The Newsroom, Newshour or Newsday). During such time slots as weeknights 11pm-12am GMT and that of Sportsworld, no news summaries are broadcast. As part of the BBC's policy for breaking news, the Service is the first to receive a full report for foreign news.

Availability

Americas
BBC World Service is available by subscription to Sirius XM's satellite radio service in the United States. Its Canadian affiliate, Sirius XM Canada, does the same in Canada. More than 300 public radio stations across the US carry World Service news broadcasts —mostly during the overnight and early-morning hours— over AM and FM radio, distributed by American Public Media (APM). Some public radio stations also carry the World Service in its entirely via HD Radio. The BBC and Public Radio International (PRI) co-produce the programme The World with WGBH Radio Boston, and the BBC was previously involved with The Takeaway morning news programme based at WNYC in New York City. BBC World Service programming also airs as part of CBC Radio One's CBC Radio Overnight schedule in Canada.

BBC shortwave broadcasts to this region were traditionally enhanced by the Atlantic Relay Station and the Caribbean Relay Company, a station in Antigua run jointly with Deutsche Welle. In addition, an exchange agreement with Radio Canada International gave access to their station in New Brunswick. However, "changing listening habits" led the World Service to end shortwave radio transmission directed to North America and Australasia on 1 July 2001. A shortwave listener coalition formed to oppose the change.

The BBC broadcasts to Central America and South America in several languages. It is possible to receive the Western African shortwave radio broadcasts from eastern North America, but the BBC does not guarantee reception in this area. It has ended its specialist programming to the Falkland Islands but continues to provide a stream of World Service programming to the Falkland Islands Radio Service.

Asia
For several decades, the World Service's largest audiences have been in Asia, the Middle East, Near East and South Asia. Transmission facilities in the UK and Cyprus were supplemented by the former BBC Eastern Relay Station in Oman and the Far Eastern Relay Station in Singapore, formerly in Malaysia. The East Asian Relay Station moved to Thailand in 1997 when Hong Kong was handed over to Chinese sovereignty. The relay station in Thailand was closed in January 2017; currently, relay stations in Singapore and Oman serve the Asian region. Together, these facilities have given the BBC World Service an easily accessible signal in regions where shortwave listening has traditionally been popular. The English shortwave frequencies of 6.195 (49m band), 9.74 (31m band), 15.31/15.36 (19m band) and 17.76/17.79 (16m band) were widely known. On 25 March 2018, the long-established shortwave frequency of 9.74 MHz was changed to 9.9 MHz.

The largest audiences are in English, Hindi, Urdu, Nepali, Bengali, Sinhala, Tamil, Marathi and other major languages of South Asia, where BBC broadcasters are household names. The Persian service is the de facto national broadcaster of Afghanistan, along with its Iranian audience. The World Service is available up to eighteen hours a day in English across most parts of Asia, and in Arabic for the Middle East. With the addition of relays in Afghanistan and Iraq these services are accessible in most of the Middle and Near East in the evening. In Singapore, the BBC World Service in English is essentially treated as a domestic broadcaster, easily available 24/7 through long-term agreement with MediaCorp Radio. For many years Radio Television Hong Kong broadcast BBC World Service 24/7 but as of 12 February 2021, Hong Kong has banned the BBC's World Service radio from its airwaves, following swiftly on the heels of China's decision to bar its World News television channels, seemingly in retaliation for Ofcom revoking the UK broadcasting licence of China Global Television Network. In the Philippines, DZRJ 810 AM broadcasts the BBC World Service in English from 12:00–05:00 PHT (GMT+8).

Although this region has seen the launch of the only two foreign language television channels, several other services have had their radio services closed as a result of budget cuts and redirection of resources.

Japan and Korea have little tradition of World Service listening, although during the 1970s to 1980s, shortwave listening was popular in Japan. In those two countries, the BBC World Service was only available via shortwave and the Internet. As of September 2007, a satellite transmission (subscription required) became available by Skylife (Channel 791) in South Korea. In November 2016, the BBC World Service announced it plans to start broadcasts in Korean. BBC Korean, a radio and web service, started on 25 September 2017.

Jamming

The Soviet Union, Iran, Iraq and Myanmar/Burma have all jammed the BBC in the past. Mandarin was heavily jammed by the People's Republic of China until shortwave transmissions for that service ceased but China continues to jam transmissions in Uzbek and has since started to jam transmissions in English throughout Asia.

Europe
The BBC World Service is broadcast in Berlin on 94.8 MHz. FM relays are also available in Ceske Budjovice, Karlovy Vary, Plzen, Usti nad Labem, Zlin and Prague in the Czech Republic, Pristina, Riga, Tallinn, Tirana and Vilnius. A BBC World Service channel is available on DAB+ in Brussels and Flanders and Amsterdam, the Hague, Utrecht and Rotterdam. Following a national reorganisation of DAB multiplexes in October 2017, the station is available on DAB+ across the whole of Denmark.

The World Service employed a medium wave transmitter at Orford Ness to provide English-language coverage to Europe, including on the frequency 648 kHz (which could be heard in parts of the south-east of England during the day and most of the UK after dark). Transmissions on this frequency were stopped on 27 March 2011, as a consequence of the budgetary constraints imposed on the BBC World Service in the 2010 budget review. A second channel (1296 kHz) traditionally broadcast in various Central European languages, but this frequency has also been discontinued and in 2005 it began regular English-language transmissions via the Digital Radio Mondiale (DRM) format. This is a digital shortwave technology that VT expects to become the standard for cross-border transmissions in developed countries.

In the 1990s, the BBC purchased and constructed large medium wave and FM networks in the former Soviet bloc, particularly the Czech (BBC Czech Section), Slovak Republics (BBC Slovak Section), Poland (BBC Polish Section) (where it was a national network) and Russia (BBC Russian Service). It had built up a strong audience during the Cold War, whilst economic restructuring made it difficult for these governments to refuse Western investment. Many of these facilities have now returned to domestic control, as economic and political conditions have changed.

On Monday, 18 February 2008, the BBC World Service stopped analogue shortwave transmissions to Europe. The notice stated, "Increasing numbers of people around the world are choosing to listen to radio on a range of other platforms including FM, satellite and online, with fewer listening on shortwave." It is sometimes possible to pick up the BBC World Service in Europe on SW frequencies targeted at North Africa. The BBC's powerful 198 kHz LW, which broadcasts the domestic BBC Radio 4 to Britain during the day (and carries the World Service during the night) can also be heard in nearby parts of Europe, including the Republic of Ireland, the Netherlands, Belgium and parts of France, Germany and Scandinavia.

In Malta, BBC News bulletins are carried by a number of radio stations, including Radju Malta and Magic 91.7, owned by national broadcaster PBS Ltd. These are broadcast at various points in the day and supplement news bulletins broadcast in Maltese from the PBS Newsroom.

Former BBC shortwave transmitters are located in the United Kingdom at Rampisham Down in Dorset, Woofferton in Shropshire and Skelton in Cumbria. The former BBC East Mediterranean Relay Station is in Cyprus.

In response to the 2022 Russian invasion of Ukraine, the BBC began broadcasting World Service English programming at shortwave frequencies 15.735 MHz and 5875 kHz for receivers in Ukraine and parts of Russia.

Pacific
The World Service is available as part of the subscription Digital Air package (available from Foxtel and Austar) in Australia. ABC NewsRadio, SBS Radio, and various community radio stations also broadcast many programmes. Many of these stations broadcast a straight feed during the midnight to dawn period. It is also available via the satellite service Optus Aurora, which is encrypted but available without subscription. In Sydney, Australia, a transmission of the service can be received at 152.025 MHz. It is also available on the DAB+ Network in Australia on SBS Radio 4 (except during Eurovision and special events). 2MBS-FM 102.5, a classical music station in Sydney, also carries the BBC World Service news programmes at 7a.m. and 8a.m. on weekdays, during its Music for a New Day breakfast programme.

Shortwave relays from Singapore (see Asia, above) continue, but historic relays via Australian Broadcasting Corporation (ABC) and Radio New Zealand International were wound down in the late 1990s. BBC World Service relays on Radio Australia now carry the BBC Radio news programmes.

In the Pacific and New Zealand, the Auckland Radio Trust operates a BBC World Service network as a non-profit donation-funded public broadcaster. It broadcasts on 810 kHz in Auckland, 107.0 MHz in Whitianga and Whangamatā, 107.3 MHz in Kaipara Harbour, 88.2 MHz in Suva and Nadi, 100.0 MHz in Bairiki and Tarawa, 101.1 MHz in Pohnpei, 107.6 MHz in Port Moresby, 105.9 MHz in Honiara, 99.0 MHz in Port Vila and Luganville, and 100.1 MHz in Funafuti. The station also broadcasts local content.

In New Zealand, AREC FM carries the BBC World Service 24/7 in the Wellington region. Available on 107.0 MHz in the CBD, 87.6 MHz in Porirua/Mana, and 87.9 MHz in Waikanae/Paraparaumu. AREC FM is a non-profit donation funded LPFM broadcaster and a subscriber to the Community Broadcasting Association of Australia's Community Radio Network (Australia).

In New Zealand, Radio Tarana and members of the Association of Community Access Broadcasters carry some BBC World Service programmes. The BBC World Service was previously available on 1233 kHz in Wellington between 1990 and 1994, and again from 1996 to 1997.

UK
The BBC World Service is broadcast on DAB, Freeview, Virgin Media and Sky platforms. It is also broadcast overnight on the frequencies of BBC Radio 4 and the Welsh language service BBC Radio Cymru following their closedown at 0000 or 0100 British time. The BBC World Service does not receive funding for broadcasts to the UK. In southeast England, the station could be picked up reliably on medium wave 648 kHz, which was targeted at mainland Europe.

According to RAJAR, the station broadcasts to a weekly audience of 1.3 million with a listening share of 0.6% as of December 2022.

Presentation

Opening tune

The World Service uses several tunes and sounds to represent the station. A previous signature tune of the station was a five note motif, composed by David Arnold and which comprises a variety of voices declaim "This is the BBC in..." before going on to name various cities (e.g. Kampala, Milan, Delhi, Johannesburg), followed by the station's slogan and the Greenwich Time Signal. This was heard throughout the network with a few variations – in the UK the full service name was spoken, whereas just the name of the BBC was used outside the UK. The phrase "This is London" was used previously in place of a station slogan.

The tune "Lillibullero" was another well known signature tune of the network following its broadcast previously as part of the top-of-the-hour sequence. This piece of music is no longer heard before news bulletins. The use of the tune gained minor controversy because of its background as a Protestant marching song in Northern Ireland.

The Prince of Denmark's March (commonly known as the Trumpet Voluntary) was often broadcast by the BBC Radio during World War II, especially when programming was directed to occupied Denmark, as the march symbolised a connection between the two countries. It remained for many years the signature tune of the BBC European Service.

In addition to these tunes, the BBC World Service also uses several interval signals. The English service uses a recording of Bow Bells, made in 1926 and used a symbol of hope during the Second World War, only replaced for a brief time during the 1970s with the tune to the nursery rhyme "Oranges and Lemons". The morse code of the letter "V" has also been used as a signal and was introduced in January 1941 and had several variations including timpani, the first four notes of Beethoven's Fifth Symphony (which coincide with the letter "V"), and electronic tones which until recently remained in use for some Western European services. In other languages, the interval signal is three notes, pitched B–B-C. However, these symbols have been used less frequently.

Time
The network operates using Greenwich Mean Time, regardless of the time zone and time of year, and is announced on the hour on the English service as "13 hours GMT" (1300 GMT) or "Midnight Greenwich Mean Time" (0000 GMT). The BBC World Service traditionally broadcasts the chimes of Big Ben in London at the start of a new year.

"This is London"
A BBC News report would begin with its station identification phrase "This is London" or "This is London calling". The phrase has become a trademark of the BBC World Service, and has been influential in popular culture, such as music. In 1979, the British punk rock band The Clash released the hit song "London Calling", which was partly based on the station identification phrase.

During the Eurovision Song Contest, before announcing the contest points from the UK, the broadcaster from the BBC delivering the votes usually begins with "This is London Calling". In 2019, the BBC started a weekly podcast called Eurovision Calling with Jayde Adams and Scott Mills.

Magazine publishing

The BBC World Service previously published magazines and programme guides:

 London Calling: listings
 BBC Worldwide: included features of interest to an international audience (included London Calling as an insert)
 BBC on Air: mainly listings
 BBC Focus on Africa: current affairs

Assessments

British soft power
The World Service claims that its aim is to be "the world's best-known and most-respected voice in international broadcasting, thereby bringing benefit to the UK, the BBC, and to audiences around the world", while retaining a "balanced British view" of international developments. In 2022, the Financial Times wrote that the World Service "is considered a pillar of British soft power", and a House of Lords Library report noted the widespread recognition of this soft power. According to the American socialist magazine Monthly Review in 2022, former director Peter Horrocks inferred the World Service's scope to Russian state broadcaster RT as a means of extending international influence and soft power,

In 2014, Conservative MP John Whittingdale, chair of the Culture, Media and Sport Select Committee, characterising the BBC's primary mission as fighting an 'Information War' (a role which some media scholars agree to), saying: "We are being outgunned massively by the Russians and Chinese and that’s something I’ve raised with the BBC. It is frightening the extent to which we are losing the information war.” In March 2022, as the Russian invasion of Ukraine started, the UK government announced additional emergency funding for the World Service to provide "independent, impartial and accurate news to people in Ukraine and Russia in the face of increased propaganda from the Russian state" and to counter "Putin’s lies and exposing his propaganda and fake news".

BBC Persian Service
In the context of the Iranian Revolution, the BBC World Service's Persian-language service has been criticised for its role in promoting the Shah's regime and undermining local norms in favour of British-selected values, with the British Ambassador in Iran, Peter Ramsbotham, stating in reaction to a Service-sponsored poetry contest (in celebration of the 2500th anniversary of the founding of the Archaemenid empire) that the organisation "seems to be damaging its image by acquiring a reputation for employing and supporting 'old brigade' expatriates." 

Furthermore, it appears that the Foreign & Commonwealth Office made a concerted effort to produce favourable coverage of Persia to BBC World Service audiences in order to maintain cordiality with the Shah's regime. For example, in December 1973, a memo from Ramsbotham details a request from the Iranian Prime Minister for the text of a broadcast about Iran by Peter Avery, lecturer in Persian Studies and Fellow at King's College, Cambridge, which he deemed 'excellent' and wanted to show the Shah. This later became the programme Iran: Oil and the Shah's Arab Neighbours which was aired globally on 1 December 1973, much to the chagrin of the Iranian people, who began airing their frustrations against the British government out on the BBC Persian Service; By 1976, Ramsbotham's successor, Sir Anthony Parsons, concluded that the Persian Service has lost its propaganda value and supported discontinuing the service: "[It] is well known that the vernacular service is financed by the FCO and is therefore firmly considered by the Iranians as an official organ of the government."

In September 2022, the World Service announced the closure of its Persian and Arabic radio service as part of a cost-cutting plan, but an online service will remain.

See also

 1988–1994 British broadcasting voice restrictions
 BBC Media Action
 BBC World Service Television

References

External links

 
 BBC World Service Radio frequencies
 BBC World Service Radio in different languages
 BBC News Language Selection at BBC Online

 
1932 establishments in England
World Service
International broadcasters
Podcasting companies
Public Radio International
Radio in Africa
Radio in Asia
Radio in Europe
Radio in North America
Radio in South America
Radio stations established in 1932
Radio stations in the United Kingdom
Sirius XM Radio channels
Publicly funded broadcasters